Iulius Rufinianus was a Latin rhetor lived in the 4th century AD. He wrote a book entitled .

References

External links
Rhetores Latini minores, Karl Halm (ed.), Lipsiae in aedibus B. G. Teubneri, 1863, pp. 37-62.

Ancient Roman rhetoricians
4th-century Latin writers